The People's Liberation Army in China has five rank schemes among different military branches, including Ground Force, Navy, Air Force, Rocket Force, Strategic Support Force.The Surface Force, Submarine Force, Coastal Defense Force, Marine Corps and Naval Air Force, although being a part of the Navy, maintains a different insignia to other naval fleet personnel.

Commissioned officer ranks
The rank insignia of commissioned officers.

Other ranks
The rank insignia of non-commissioned officers and enlisted personnel.

See also
 Ranks of the People's Liberation Army Ground Force
 Ranks of the People's Liberation Army Navy
 Ranks of the People's Liberation Army Air Force

References

Military ranks of the People's Republic of China
Military insignia